Raycho Raev (born 24 May 1984) is a Bulgarian football forward who currently plays for FC Karnobat.

Career
Raev previously played for FC Chernomorets Burgas in the A PFG during the 2003–04 season.

References

 

1984 births
Living people
Bulgarian footballers
Association football midfielders
First Professional Football League (Bulgaria) players
FC Chernomorets Burgas players
OFC Sliven 2000 players
FC Lyubimets players
FC Bansko players
Association football forwards